A personal watercraft (PWC), also called water scooter or jet ski, is a recreational watercraft that a rider sits or stands on, not within, as in a boat.  PWCs have two style categories, first and most popular being a runabout or "sit down" where the rider uses the watercraft mainly sitting down, and the watercraft typically holds two or more people. The second style is a "stand-up", where the rider uses the watercraft standing up. The stand-up styles are built for one rider and are used more for doing tricks, racing, and use in competitions.  Both styles have an inboard engine driving a pump-jet that has a screw-shaped impeller to create thrust for propulsion and steering. Most are designed for two or three people, though four-passenger models exist. Many of today's models are built for more extended use and have the fuel capacity to make long cruises, in some cases even beyond 100 miles (161 km).

Personal watercraft are often referred by the trademarked brand names of personal watercraft by Kawasaki (Jet Ski), Yamaha (WaveRunner), Bombardier (Sea-Doo) and Honda (AquaTrax).

The United States Coast Guard defines a personal watercraft, amongst other criteria, as a jet-drive boat less than 13 feet (4 m) long. There are many larger "jetboats" not classed as PWCs, some more than 40 feet (12 m) long.

History

Water scooters—as they were originally termed—were first developed in the United Kingdom and Europe in the mid-1950s, with models such as the British 200cc propeller-driven Vincent Amanda, and the German Wave Roller. Two thousand Vincent Amandas were exported to Australia, Asia, Europe and the United States.

The Sea Skimmer was introduced in 1961 as a highly maneuverable version of a propelled surfboard.  It was 5 feet 6” long, powered by an inboard/outboard motor and reached speeds up to 25 MPH.  The rider lay on the boat, controlling the speed with hand throttles and using the feet as rudders. Originally manufactured in Kansas City, operations moved to Boynton, Florida in 1962, and changed the name to Aqua-Skimmer.  Aqua-Skimmer ceased operations in 1962 and sold its inventory to the military.  Renamed Aqua Dart (Aqua Dart INC), the Sea Skimmer, Aqua Skimmer, Aqua Dart was modified for military requirements, and saw service in 1962 river reconnaissance missions in Vietnam and other military missions until the 1970s.

In the 1960s, the idea was developed further by Clayton Jacobson II of Lake Havasu City, Arizona, USA. Originally a motocross enthusiast, Jacobson's idea was designed in the mid-1960s, powered by an internal pump-jet rather than an outboard motor, made of all aluminum, and had a fixed, upright handle. Jacobson eventually quit his job in banking to devote himself to developing the idea, and had a working prototype by 1965. It differed slightly from modern personal watercraft but had definite similarities. He completed a second prototype a year later made of fiberglass.
The first Clayton-type PWC to reach the market was designed by Bombardier in the late 1960s. Bombardier's original designs were not very popular and Bombardier left the business before 1970.

In Greece, an inventor named Dimitrios T. Moraitidis, built a prototype and submitted a patent to the government of the Kingdom of Greece on the 5th June 1970, with serial number 40056. He never exploited the invention commercially. He passed away on Mar 5 2022.

Stand-up PWCs were first produced by the Japanese company Kawasaki (under the Jet Ski brand) in 1972, and appeared on the US market in 1973. These were mass-produced boats to be used by only one rider. While they are still produced today, the more popular design is the sit down variety of PWC. These sit down runabouts have been produced by Kawasaki (Jetski), Bombardier (Sea-Doo), Yamaha (WaveRunner), Honda (AquaTrax), Polaris (Sealion) and Arctic Cat (Tigershark). As of 2010, the major manufacturers of PWCs were Kawasaki, Bombardier and Yamaha. Both Yamaha and Kawasaki continue to sell stand-up models but it is a small percentage of the overall market.

Sports 

PWC racing competitions take place around the world. There are several disciplines: closed circuit speed races, offshore speed races (offshore), endurance races, freestyle (freestyle) and freeride events. For all these types of events, with the exception of freestyle, there are at least two categories: saddle jets and stand-up jets. For speed races, gear is generally classified according to the degree of authorized modifications: minor modifications fall into the so-called "stock" category, intermediate modifications into the so-called "limited" category, and more extensive modifications into the category. known as "F1". In freestyle and freeride, these categories do not exist, we classify the competitors according to the type of watercraft used (with stand-up or saddle).

The sport is ruled by the World Powerboating Federation (U.I.M.) recognised by the IOC. The current official world series that was established in 1996 is the Aquabike World Championship. The sport is also established at national level and is ruled by each national federations member of the U.I.M.  Aquabike World Championship is known among the motorsports with most different national entries for each competition, reaching up to 32 nationalities and 140 riders registered to compete in Italy in 2018.

Other private competitions also exists such as P1 AquaX which is a personal watercraft racing series, first launched in the UK in May 2011 by London-based sports promoter Powerboat P1. The series attracted a mix of new and current racers to a new type of racing and in 2013, P1 rolled out a second series in the USA. Such was the uptake that the original format needed revising to cope with the influx of new riders and by the end of 2015 over 400 riders from 11 countries had registered to compete in an AquaX event.

In the United States, the main sanctioning bodies are the International Jet Sport Boating Association (IJSBA) and Pro Watercross (PWX). As of 2022, the sport is experiencing exceeding levels of fragmentation and conflict due to poor management of the sanctioning bodies and non-constructive competition between organizations. The IJSBA World Finals competition is traditionally held in Lake Havasu City, Arizona in early October. The Pro Watercross World Finals are typically held in Naples, Florida in November.

Non-recreational uses 

PWCs are small, fast, easily handled, fairly easy to use, and affordable, and their propulsion systems do not have external propellers, making them in some respects safer than small motorboats for swimmers and wildlife. For these reasons, they are used for fishing, one of the PWC industry's fastest-growing segments.

Lifeguards use PWCs equipped with rescue platforms to rescue water users from trouble, as well as flood survivors, and carry them to safety. Police and rangers use them to enforce laws in coastal waters, lakes and rivers.  A PWC combined with a wash-reduction system, carrying waterproof loudspeaker equipment and GPS for instructions and distance measurement, has reportedly been used by assistant coaches for rowing sports on the River Tyne.

Further, PWCs are used by the U.S. Navy as surface targets. When equipped with GPS, electronic compass, radar reflector, and a radio modem, the PWC can be controlled remotely with a two-way link. Its small shipboard footprint allows it to be stored in and deployed from the smallest of vessels, and it has been used for target practice for armaments of sizes from  cannon to small arms.

Emissions 

The American PWC industry reached an agreement with the United States Coast Guard in 1999 (see fall, 1999 BSAC Minutes), agreeing to limit the speed of a PWC to 65 mph in a specified test protocol.

Before 1991, PWC emissions were unregulated in the United States. Many were powered by two-stroke cycle engines, which are smaller and lighter than four-stroke cycle engines but more polluting. Simple two-stroke engines are lubricated on a "total loss" method, mixing lubricating oil with their fuel; they are estimated to create exhaust in excess of 25% of their fuel and oil unburned in addition to the products of incomplete and complete combustion.

The 1990 amendments to the Clean Air Act allowed the U.S. Environmental Protection Agency to begin regulating all recreational marine engines including PWC, as well as other off-road internal combustion engines. The agency began a dialogue with manufacturers in 1991, resulting in regulations that were enacted in 1996. These regulations, set to phase in between 1998 and 2006, are considered averaging standards, because they allow manufacturers to offset more-polluting engines in their product range by offering other engines that exceed the standard. California and subsequently New York have, in turn, adopted more stringent regulations than the federal standard. Subsequent to 2004 when the maximum emission reductions required by California became effective, the substantial majority of new PWC units sold throughout the United States have met the lower emissions standards established by California.

To meet these regulations, manufacturers have adopted a variety of improvements, including increased use of four-stroke engines, the use of direct injection for two-strokes, and the use of catalytic converters and other pollution-curbing measures that overall have reduced emissions by approximately 75% compared to pre-regulation models.

In some areas, such as Lake Tahoe, outboard motors and PWCs are permitted if they meet the 2006 EPA or California Air Resources Board (CARB) 2001 regulations. Some pre-2006 model year PWCs meet this EPA standard, including all four-stroke makes and models and all two-stroke cycle direct-injection (non-carbureted) models.

Environmental groups such as the Surfrider Foundation and the Bluewater Network claim that more rapid progress could be made, and that the diminishing numbers of pre-1998 watercraft in use continue to emit substantial pollution.

Against this, industry groups such as the Personal Watercraft Industry Association point out that environmental groups continue to cite pollution levels of pre-regulation watercraft and ignore the improvements made to newer models; and furthermore, that personal watercraft are unfairly singled out when they are no more polluting than other powered boats.

Hazards

Apart from the obvious hazards of collisions and mechanical breakdowns common to all vehicles, operating or riding a PWC can involve a risk of orifice injuries. These injuries are typical of the kinds of injuries that waterskiers experience as a result of falling into the water at speed. Such injuries can occur from simply falling in the water at speed or they can occur from the output end of the pump jet. A rider who falls (or is ejected) off the back can land directly in the path of the PWC's high-pressure jet of water. Unless a rider is appropriately dressed in garments made out of a strong, thick substance like neoprene (as is commonly found in wetsuits), the jet may penetrate any orifice it reaches. All major PWC manufacturers warn about this risk and recommend that passengers wear wet suit bottoms or equivalent protection. The American Waterski Racing Association recommends that all of their racers wear wet suit bottoms for this same reason.

Such orifice injuries can result in permanent disability or death. For example, in 2006, the California Court of Appeal for the First Appellate District upheld a $3.7 million Napa County jury verdict against Polaris Industries arising out of one such incident (which had devastating effects on the victim's lower abdomen). 
It is also possible for multiple riders on the same PWC to sustain orifice injuries in a single accident, as actually occurred in a 2007 accident at Mission Bay which resulted in a San Diego County jury verdict affirmed in full on appeal in 2014.

Another noteworthy risk of injury is known as off throttle steering which results from the lack of steering capability while off throttle in certain model PWC  this can result in death or serious bodily injuries.

While also rare, spinal injuries can occur while surf jumping and, potentially, wake jumping. The PWC manufacturers owner's manuals all include warnings regarding jumping at excessive heights, or operating a PWC if there is a prior history of back injury. The current on-product labels say "Jumping wakes or waves can increase the risk of spinal/backbone injuries (paralysis)". The current Kawasaki owner's manual provides: "Slow down before crossing waves. Do not ride if you have a back condition. High speed operation in choppy or rough water may cause back injuries."

Another rare, but unique injury risk with jetboats, is being sucked into the intake side of the pump jet. Current PWC products contain on-product warnings that state: "Keep away from Intake Grate while the engine is on. Items such as long hair, loose clothing, or PFD straps can become entangled in moving parts and result in severe injury or drowning".

There have been fatal accidents involving PWCs. In a notable case, U.S. astronaut Alan G. Poindexter died in 2012 from injuries sustained in a Jet Ski accident in Florida.

See also
 Aqua scooter (of historical interest)
 Flyboard
 Video games featuring personal watercraft:
 Jet X2O
 Splashdown
 Wave Race 
 Wave Race 64
 Wave Race: Blue Storm
 Wetbike
 Yamaha Superjet
 Yamaha Wave Blaster
 Belassi Hypercraft

References

External links 

 International Jet Sports Boating Association
 

 
Water sports equipment
English inventions